Bomachoge is a former electoral constituency in Kenya. It was one of three constituencies in the now defunct Gucha District. The constituency was established for the 1988 elections. It has now been split into Bomachoge Borabu Constituency and Bomachoge Chache Constituency, both in Kisii County.

Members of Parliament

Wards

References 

Gucha District
Constituencies in Nyanza Province
1988 establishments in Kenya
Constituencies established in 1988
Former constituencies of Kenya